Radish usually refers to the common radish, a summer radish with a round red root.

It may also refer to:

 Daikon, the long-rooted East Asian white radish
 Other species and varieties of the genus Raphanus
 Radish (band), a Texan sugar metal band